Meixner Schlüter Wendt Architekten (the company's preferred way of writing it is MEIXNER SCHLÜTER WENDT Architekten) is a German architecture firm based in Frankfurt. 
The company's projects have received awards the World Architecture Festival in 2008 and at the Venice Biennale of Architecture in 2004, 2006 and 2012.

History 
Since it was first founded in Frankfurt in 1997 the office has been managed by its three partners Claudia Meixner, Florian Schlüter and Martin Wendt.
With its early, somewhat smaller projects the firm already elicited great interest among the specialist media. Today, its work ranges from exhibition design, architectural planning and design in the urban context, industrial buildings, schools, churches, cultural and residential buildings, all the way to residential high-rises.
In parallel, Claudia Meixner and Florian Schlüter hold lectures at various organizations and have also taught at the university level.

Architecture 

Very diverse in formal terms, the buildings by Meixner Schlüter Wendt have two basic things in common: They leave a very strong sculptural impression on viewers and they react to their contexts with sensitivity. Meixner Schlüter Wendt resolves this apparent conflict by using methods, principles, and strategies which are – according to design expert Lilli Hollein – established practice in the world of visual arts but, by contrast, rather unusual for German architecture firms.
One common practice at the practice is to play calculated games with levels of perception. To this end, in their design process, the architects evoke specific associations with what is particular to a certain location and the relevant construction brief, associations which are the result of observing and analyzing everyday things or rather the way they are arranged. This can, for instance, include recourse to conventional building typologies and to well-known techniques from the history of construction, such as the kind of encrustations or reliefs which Meixner Schlüter Wendt sees as intellectual ready-mades, something which they can reinterpret and transform into buildings of a completely new kind.
	
As a reaction to the differing heights of the surroundings in Frankfurt's Europaviertel, for the Axis project, for instance, the architects combined a slim high-rise, a multistory building and a row of terraced houses to form a "perimeter block high-rise". In the case of the "Schmuck" detached family residence in Frankfurt's Westend district, by contrast, the firm transformed the typologies that are the "Hofreite" (a kind of courtyard ensemble), the patio house and the villa into a more complex "living space sculpture", including in the process the connecting walls of the neighboring buildings. To use another example, in 2003, a pontoon served as the inspiration for the Café des Licht- und Luftbades (Light and Air Bath Café) on the banks of the flood-prone river Main in Frankfurt's Niederrad district, the kind of ship-like construction that will float if there is flooding.
In the case of the partial dismantlement of the Dornbuschkirche, the church in the eponymous district of Dornbusch, Meixner Schlüter Wendt reproduced what used to be the nave of the church in a new relief wall, thus preserving people's memories of the demolished section of the structure in the form of an impression in the new architecture. For the reinterpretation of the Henniger Turm, which was knocked down in 2013, the firm also reacted to collective memories. Whereas both the contours and the side facing the city are strongly reminiscent of the original appearance of the old silo, the three other sides indicate the new building's function as a residential tower.

Buildings (selection) 
 2002–2003 "Wohnhaus S." residential building, Karlsruhe.
 2003 Licht- und Luftbad snack bar pontoon, Niederrad, Frankfurt.
 2004–2006 Dornbuschkirche, Frankfurt.
 2005–2006 "Wohnhaus Wohlfahrt-Laymann" residential building, Oberursel (Taunus).
 2005–2007 "Wohnhaus F" residential building, Kronberg im Taunus.
 2006–2009 Ordnungsamt (public order office), Frankfurt.
 2009–2011 "Wohnhaus Schmuck" residential building, Frankfurt.
 2010 Leseraum/Ding reading room in the Museum für Moderne Kunst; Frankfurt.
 2010–2012 "Dock 2.0" office building, Frankfurt.
 2012 "Schirnstudio 2.0", Schirn Kunsthalle, Frankfurt.
 2012–2016 "Axis" residential high-rise, Frankfurt.
 2012–2017 New Henninger Turm, Frankfurt.
 2015–2017 Evangelische Akademie Frankfurt, Frankfurt.

Awards (selection) 
 1988 Schinkelpreis, Kunst und Bauen, 1st prize
 1995 Villa Massimo Award, Rome, Architecture
 2003 Deutscher Architekturpreis, recognition for new Licht und Luftbad snack bar pontoon
 2006 Wüstenrot-Stiftung's design prize "Umbau im Bestand" (conversion work on existing buildings), 1st prize, Dornbuschkirche
 2008 World Architecture Festival, Award Winner in the category "Religion and Contemplation", Dornbuschkirche
 2012 ECOLA Award, European Conference for Leading Architects, Schmuck residential building, 1st prize for -optimized renovation, refurbishment, conversion work
 2012 Chicago Athenaeum, International Architecture Award, prize for the Schmuck residential building
 2017 FIABCI Prix d'Excellence 2017 Germany, category residential for the Axis residential high-rise

Useful links 

 
   at archINFORM
 Meixner Schlüter Wendt Architekten at BauNetz

Notes 

Companies established in 1997
20th-century German architects
21st-century German architects
Architecture firms of Germany
Companies based in Frankfurt